James Michael Richey (born January 30, 1947) is a former American football offensive tackle. 

Richey was born in Washington, D.C. in 1947. He attended Myers Park High School in North Carolina and played college football at the university of North Carolina.

He played professional in the American Football League (AFL) for the Buffalo Bills in 1969 and in National Football League (NFL) for the New Orleans Saints in 1970. He appeared in 19 games for the Bills and Broncos, five as a starter.

References

1947 births
Living people
American football offensive tackles
North Carolina Tar Heels football players
New Orleans Saints players
Players of American football from Washington, D.C.
Buffalo Bills players